The 1978 Western Michigan Broncos football team represented Western Michigan University in the Mid-American Conference (MAC) during the 1978 NCAA Division I-A football season.  In their fourth season under head coach Elliot Uzelac, the Broncos compiled a 7–4 record (5–4 against MAC opponents), finished in fourth place in the MAC, and outscored their opponents, 220 to 152.  The team played its home games at Waldo Stadium in Kalamazoo, Michigan.

The team's statistical leaders included Albert Little with 828 passing yards, Jerome Persell with 1,346 rushing yards, and Tim Clysdale with 213 receiving yards. Tailback Jerome Persell, fullback Keith Rogien, and safety Greg Williams were the team captains. For the third consecutive year, tailback Jerome Persell received the team's most outstanding player award. Persell was also named MAC offensive player of the year for the third consecutive year.

Schedule

References

Western Michigan
Western Michigan Broncos football seasons
Western Michigan Broncos football